Roncola is a comune (municipality) in the Province of Bergamo in the Italian region of Lombardy, located about  northeast of Milan and about  northwest of Bergamo.  

Roncola borders the following municipalities: Almenno San Bartolomeo, Bedulita, Capizzone, Caprino Bergamasco, Costa Valle Imagna, Palazzago, Sant'Omobono Terme, Strozza, Torre de' Busi.

References